Cerastium ligusticum is a species of annual herb in the family Caryophyllaceae. They have a self-supporting growth form. They have simple, broad leaves. Individuals can grow to 0.11 m.

Sources

References 

ligusticum
Flora of Malta